For Australia is a 1915 Australian silent film directed by Monte Luke.

Plot
A newspaper journalist, Stanley Lane (Boyd Irwin), discovers a German spy ring in Sydney led by Carl Hoffman (Charles Villiers). Lane is captured and imprisoned by Germans on an uncharted Pacific Island.

With the help of half-caste Samoan girl Kana (Alma Rock Phillips) he escapes and destroys a German wireless station in Samoa. He is re-captured and tied to a tree in a crocodile-infested swamp, but Kana saves him again. Later,  invades the island and Hoffman runs into the swamp and is eaten by crocodiles.

Cast
Alma Rock Phillips as Kana
Boyd Irwin as Stanley Lane
Gwen Burroughs as Mrs De Winter
Charles Villiers as Carl Hoffman
Percy Walshe

Production
The film was made with the co-operation of the Australian government. It was mostly shot in and around Sydney with some scenes at an aboriginal mission at Brewarrina in northern New South Wales.

Release
The film was previewed in Melbourne on 18 October 1915. The Winner stated that:
The picture is a distinctly good example of what can be accomplished in locally-made films. The story is interesting... and has the right grip for picture purposes. Some fine natural scenery has been secured for many of the sections, and the Sydney-Emden fight has been cleverly worked out. On the whole, Mr Monte Luke, the director, and all associated with him in the production, have every reason to be proud of their work. 
However the film was not a success at the box office.

For the Honour of Australia
The movie was combined with another film, How We Beat the Emden (1915), and the documentary How We Fought the Emden, to make a new movie for release in Britain called For the Honour of Australia (1916). A copy of this survives today.

References

External links
 
For Australia at National Film and Sound Archive
Clip from film at Australian Screen Online

Australian black-and-white films
1915 films
1910s war drama films
Australian war drama films
Australian silent feature films
1915 drama films
Films directed by Monte Luke
Silent war drama films
Australian World War I films
1910s English-language films